Chifeng Petroglyphs, also known as Chifeng Rock Art, are images carved into the rocks of Chifeng, Inner Mongolia. These petroglyphs were carved by the nomads of ancient northern China.

Chifeng Rock Art, dating back to 8000 to 7000 years ago, is an important part of the rock painting system in Inner Mongolia and even in northern China. The petroglyphs located here are dominated by human faces and animals, with human faces prominently represented by the eyes, followed by the mouth and nose, and then by the ears.

Discovery and research
Chifeng Petroglyphs have been discovered one after another since the 1980s. The petroglyphs here are characterized by a long history, a wide variety of categories and exquisite techniques, and they occupy an important position in the world rock painting system.

References

Petroglyphs
Prehistoric art
Rock art
Rock art in China
Rock art in Asia
Archaeological sites in China